USS Garfield County (LST-784) was an  built for the United States Navy during World War II. Named after counties in Colorado, Montana, Nebraska, Oklahoma, Utah, and Washington, she was the only U.S. Naval vessel to bear the name.

LST-784 was laid down on 18 June 1944 at Pittsburgh, Pennsylvania by the Dravo Corporation; launched on 29 July 1944; sponsored by Mrs. Michael Ruzic; and commissioned on 1 September 1944.

Service history
During World War II, LST-784 was assigned to the Asiatic-Pacific theater and participated in the assault and occupation of Iwo Jima in February and March, 1945 and the assault and occupation of Okinawa Gunto in April through June, 1945. Following the war, LST-784 performed occupation duty in the Far East until mid-September 1945. She was decommissioned in March 1946 and assigned to the Columbia River Group of the Pacific Reserve Fleet. On 1 July 1955, the ship was redesignated USS Garfield County (LST-784). Her final fate is unknown.
 
LST-784 earned two battle stars for World War II service.

See also
 List of United States Navy LSTs

References

 
 

LST-542-class tank landing ships
World War II amphibious warfare vessels of the United States
Ships built in Pittsburgh
Garfield County, Colorado
Garfield County, Montana
Garfield County, Nebraska
Garfield County, Oklahoma
Garfield County, Utah
Garfield County, Washington
1944 ships
Ships built by Dravo Corporation